"Armistice Day" is a song by Australian rock band Midnight Oil, released in May 1982 as the second and final single from the band's third studio album, Place without a Postcard. The song peaked at no. 31 in Australia.

Track listing
 "Armistice Day"  - 4:28
 "Stand in Line" (Live) - 5:54

Charts

References 

1982 singles
Midnight Oil songs
Songs written by Rob Hirst
Songs written by Jim Moginie
Songs written by Martin Rotsey
Columbia Records singles
Song recordings produced by Glyn Johns
1981 songs